The Old English Bulldog is an extinct breed of dog.

Physical characteristics 

The Old English Bulldog was compact, broad and muscular, as reflected in the painting Crib and Rosa. Through John Scott's engraving, this painting became the best-known and most reproduced painting of dogs from that period.

History 

The English blood sport of bull-baiting allowed for a specialized breed in the form of the Old English Bulldog. The main locations in London for these exhibitions were the Westminster Pit, Beargarden and Old Conduit Fields.

Breeding 

Historians are fairly confident that the Old English Bulldog is derived from ancient war dogs, such as the old Mastiff or the extinct Alaunt dog. Others believe that the true origin of the breed is not entirely clear.  Depictions in old prints show that the variety was without doubt a small Mastiff with a comparatively long head.  The word 'Mastiff' was eventually dropped when describing these smaller Mastiffs, as the Mastiff proper was found too slow for bull-baiting.

Description 
Two other recognized members of the breed can be seen in the 1817 painting Crib and Rosa, with Rosa exemplifying the form and size of the ideal type of Old English Bulldog, albeit deficient in wrinkles about the head and neck and in substance of bone in the limbs.

Many authors bring us descriptions about the extinct bulldog, but this description by William Hamilton Maxwell stands out as one of the most extensive:

Decline 

In England, the passage of the Cruelty to Animals Act 1835 caused a decline of bull-baiting and dog fighting, leading to a lack of interest in perpetuating the Old English Bulldog. Three dogs from the Duke of Hamilton's strain of Old English Bulldog, Wasp, Child, and Billy, were depicted in a painting and recognized as some of the last known members of the breed before it became extinct.

Despite the laws making dog fighting illegal, it continued for many years. Breeders determined a cross between the Old English Bulldog and Old English Terrier created a superior fighting dog with increased quickness and dexterity. This new breed of dog, called the bull and terrier, was a precursor to the Staffordshire Bull Terrier, Bull Terrier and American Pit Bull Terrier and accelerated the extinction of the Old English Bulldog.

English Bulldog 

Often confused with the Old English Bulldog, the English Bulldog is noted for its sweet disposition; it does not have the speed and agility that were the definitive characteristics of the Old English Bulldog.

See also 
 Bulldog type
 List of dog breeds
 List of dog fighting breeds
 List of extinct dog breeds

References

Further reading 
Brearley J.M. (1985). The Book of the Bulldog. TFH Publications. 
 Cooper H.J. (2005). Bulldogs and Bulldog Breeding. Vintage Dog Books. 
Fleig, D. (1996). History of Fighting Dogs. Neptune, NJ: TFH Publications. 
Homan, M. (2000). A Complete History of Fighting Dogs. Howell Book House Inc. 
Jenkins, R. (1997). The Story of the Real Bulldog. Neptune, NJ: TFH Publications. 
McDonald, J. (1985). The Book of the Bulldog. Neptune, NJ: TFH Publications. 
Thomas C. (2000). Bulldogs Today. Ringpress Books.

External links 

A Brief History of the Bulldog

Dog fighting breeds
Dog breeds originating in England
Bulldog breeds
Extinct dog breeds